is a passenger railway station located in the city of Kan'onji, Kagawa, Kagawa Prefecture, Japan.  It is operated by JR Shikoku and has the station number "Y19".

Lines
Kan'onji Station is served by the JR Shikoku Yosan Line and is located 56.5 km from the beginning of the line at Takamatsu. Yosan line local, Rapid Sunport, and Nanpū Relay services stop at the station.

The following JR Shikoku limited express services also stop at the station:

Layout
The station consists of two side platforms and one island platforms serving four tracks. A station building houses a waiting room, shops, a JR Midori no Madoguchi staffed ticket office and a JR Travel Centre (Warp Plaza). Platform 1 is accessed directly through the ticket gate from the station building. Platforms 2 and 3 (island) and platform 4 (side) are accessed by means of an underpass. Parking and car rental are available. Two sidings branch off the main tracks.

Adjacent stations

History
At that time the station was operated by Japanese Government Railways, later becoming Japanese National Railways (JNR). With the privatization of JNR on 1 April 1987, control of the station passed to JR Shikoku.

Surrounding area
Kanonji City Hall
Kanonji Civic Hall
Kanonji City Central Library
Kagawa Prefectural Kanonji General High School
Kagawa Prefectural Kannonji First High School

See also
 List of railway stations in Japan

References

External links

Kan'onji Station (JR Shikoku)

Railway stations in Kagawa Prefecture
Railway stations in Japan opened in 1913
Kan'onji, Kagawa